Kevin Bryant Mahogany (July 30, 1958 – December 17, 2017) was an American jazz vocalist who became prominent in the 1990s. Particularly known for his scat singing, his singing style has been compared with those of Billy Eckstine, Joe Williams and Johnny Hartman.

Early years
Mahogany began his study of music as a child with piano and later learned to play the clarinet and baritone saxophone, performing with jazz bands and teaching music while still in high school. He said, "When I was a kid, music was just as important as English and math in our household... Piano lessons were a grade school staple for the whole family." He attended Baker University, where he performed with instrumental and vocal ensembles and formed a vocal jazz group.  In 1981, he received his BFA in music and English drama.

Performing
After graduating, Mahogany returned to Kansas City, where he attracted a local following in the 1980s performing with his groups "The Apollos" and "Mahogany". In 1995 he was featured on a CD by Frank Mantooth.

Mahogany's first CD as a solo artist was Double Rainbow (1993). It was followed by the album Kevin Mahogany (1996), which gained positive attention in the media, and prompted Newsweek to call Mahogany "the standout jazz vocalist of his generation."

Mahogany appeared in Robert Altman's film Kansas City (1996), playing a character said to be based on Kansas City singer Big Joe Turner.

In 1997, Mahogany was featured on the soundtrack to Midnight in the Garden of Good and Evil singing Laura, written by Johnny Mercer.

He has listed his vocal influences as Lambert, Hendricks and Ross, Al Jarreau and Eddie Jefferson. He has taught at the Berklee College of Music in Boston and the University of Miami.

In 2016, he was featured on the track "Special Girl" on the CD Bang & Classic by Polish rapper Bosski Roman.

Death
Mahogany died on December 17, 2017 from the effects of diabetes. He was 59.

Discography

As leader
 Double Rainbow (Enja, 1993)
 Songs and Moments (Enja, 1994)
 You Got What It Takes (Enja, 1995)
 Kevin Mahogany (Warner Bros., 1996)
 Another Time Another Place (Warner Bros., 1997)
 My Romance (Warner Bros., 1998)
 Pussy Cat Dues: The Music of Charles Mingus (Enja, 2000)
 Pride & Joy (Telarc, 2002)
 Big Band (Zebra, 2005)
 The Vienna Affair (Cracked AnEgg, 2015)

As sideman
 Monty Alexander, My America (Telarc, 2002)
 Cheryl Bentyne, Moonlight Serenade (King, 2003)
 Ray Brown, Some of My Best Friends Are...Singers (Telarc, 1998)
 Elvin Jones, It Don't Mean a Thing (Enja, 1993)
 Tony Lakatos, The Coltrane Hartman Fantasy Vol. 1 (Skip, 2010)
 Frank Mantooth, Sophisticated Lady (Sea Breeze, 1995)
 T. S. Monk, Monk on Monk (N2K Encoded, 1991)
 Marlena Shaw, Dangerous (Concord Jazz, 1996)
 Roseanna Vitro, Passion Dance (Telarc, 1996)

References

External links
 
 
  
 

1958 births
2017 deaths
Musicians from Kansas City, Missouri
American jazz singers
Baker University alumni
Berklee College of Music faculty
Enja Records artists
University of Miami faculty
Singers from Missouri
Jazz musicians from Missouri
20th-century African-American male singers
21st-century African-American male singers